Clarence Miller may refer to:

 Clarence Miller (activist) (1906–?), 20th-century American labor activist
 Clarence B. Miller (1872–1922), United States Representative from Minnesota
 Clarence E. Miller (1917–2011), United States Representative from Ohio
 Clarence H. Miller (1930–2019), Renaissance scholar at Saint Louis University
 Clarence Horatius Miller (1922–1992), American jazz and blues singer

See also
 Clarrie Millar (1925–2017), Australian politician